Robert Stiegler (1938–1990) was a Chicago filmmaker and photographer, whose work grew out of the approaches to photography and design taught at the Institute of Design (ID) in the 1960s and 1970s. Stiegler received his Bachelor's degree in 1960 and his Master's degree in 1970 from ID, where he studied under Harry Callahan and Aaron Siskind and was part of a group of students that included Barbara Crane, Kenneth Josephson, Tom Rago, and Richard Nickel. His work is in the collections of the Museum of Modern Art in New York, the Art Institute of Chicago, the George Eastman House, the Museum of Contemporary Art in Chicago, and the University of Illinois Chicago. His films Traffic (1960), Capitulation (1965), Licht Spiel Nur 1 (1967), and Full Circle (1968) are housed at the Chicago Film Archives.

Biography 
Robert Stiegler lived in Chicago his entire life as a photographer and filmmaker. During his artistic career he became best known for his street documentation, nature photography, positive and negative abstractions, and films.

Stiegler studied with Harry Callahan and Aaron Siskind from 1956-1960 at the Institute of Design, as well as working for other Chicago photographers such as Vince Maselli, and Morton Goldsholl Design Associates in the early 1960s.

In 1966, Stiegler took a professorship at the University of Illinois at Chicago. There, he headed the Photography Department, becoming a key figure in establishing the program that exists today. Stiegler taught at the university until his death in 1990.

Photography career 

Stiegler received grants from the National Endowment for the Arts and the Illinois Arts Council.

Gallery 400 at the University of Illinois at Chicago mounted a retrospective of his work in 1992. Stiegler's work was included in an exhibition of more than fifty photographs by students of ID professors Harry Callahan and Aaron Siskind at Stephen Daiter Gallery in 2010. Museum of Contemporary Art Chicago exhibited his work Chicago, 1974, alongside other Chicago photographers, and filmmakers during the CITY SELF exhibition in 2014. The California Museum of Photography showcased a retrospective of photography in Chicago in honor of Charles Desmarais in 2016. The exhibition, The Chicago Gift Revisited, displayed Stiegler’s work with pieces from twenty-two other Chicago-based photographers. Stiegler's work was showcased at Art Basel in 2017, represented by the Corbett vs. Dempsey. Stephen Daiter Gallery in Chicago presented a solo exhibition of Stiegler's work in the spring of 2022. 

The Library of Congress holds Stiegler's photograph State Street, Chicago (1973) in its collection. Pieces in the AIC collection include Chicago Circus (1976), Temple of Amon, Luxor Eg. (1981), Untitled (1965), and Untitled, (1971).

Film career 
Robert Stiegler’s practice included both photography and filmmaking. During his time at Institute of Design (ID) he experimented with film, creating multiple works exploring abstraction, and negative exposure.

Out of the Vault: Robert Stiegler – Light Play, showcased a collection of his film works including Traffic (1960), Capitulation (1965), Licht Spiel Nur (1967), Full Circle (1968). Each work was shown on 16mm film. This program of films highlights the influence of Moholy-Nagy’s teachings on his work, in particular his use of light and interest in formal experimentation.

Exhibition history

Film showings

Grants and fellowships

References 

1938 births
1990 deaths
American filmmakers
20th-century American photographers
People from Chicago
Filmmakers from Illinois
Photographers from Illinois